The 2002 WNBA season was the sixth season for the New York Liberty. The Liberty franchise reached their 4th berth to the WNBA Finals, but lost in a sweep to the Los Angeles Sparks. As of the 2016 season, this was the last season that New York qualified for the WNBA Finals.

Offseason

WNBA Draft

Regular season

Season standings

Season schedule

Player stats

References

New York Liberty seasons
New York
New York Liberty
Eastern Conference (WNBA) championship seasons